The eleventh season of King of the Hill originally aired Sundays at 8:30–9:00 p.m. (EST) and 7:30–8:00 p.m. (EST) on the Fox Broadcasting Company from January 28 to May 20, 2007. The Region 1 DVD was released on August 25, 2015.

Production
The showrunners for the season were John Altschuler and Dave Krinsky.

Episodes

References

2006 American television seasons
2007 American television seasons
King of the Hill 11